Bogʻot (Боғот, باغات) is an urban-type settlement and seat of Bogʻot District in Xorazm Region in Uzbekistan. Its population was 4,524 people in 1989, and 10,700 in 2016.

References

Populated places in Xorazm Region
Urban-type settlements in Uzbekistan